This article contains information about the literary events and publications of 1570.

Events
December (approximate date) – Torquato Tasso travels to Paris in the service of Cardinal Luigi d'Este.
unknown date – The Académie de Poésie et de Musique is founded in France by the poet Jean-Antoine de Baïf and the musician Joachim Thibault de Courville.

New books

Prose
Roger Ascham – The Scholemaster (posthumous)
William Baldwin – Beware the Cat (new edition)
Thomas North – The Fables of Bidpai: The Morall Philosophie of Doni (translation of the Panchatantra from the Italian of Anton Francesco Doni)
Abraham Ortelius – Theatrum Orbis Terrarum (the first modern atlas)

Poetry
See 1570 in poetry

Births
October 4 – Péter Pázmány, Hungarian philosopher and theologian (died 1637)
December 29 – Wilhelm Lamormaini, Netherlandish theologian (died 1648)
Unknown dates
Sir Robert Aytoun, Scottish poet (died 1638)
Pedro de Oña, Chilean poet (died 1643)
Alexander Leighton, Scottish pamphleteer (died 1649)

Deaths
February 28 – Domingo de Santo Tomás, Spanish grammarian (born 1499)
March 25 – Johann Walter, German poet and composer (born 1496)
July 3 – Aonio Paleario, Italian humanist, reformer and pamphleteer (born c. 1500)
October 20 – João de Barros, Portuguese historian (born 1496)
November – Jacques Grévin, French dramatist (born c. 1539)

References

Years of the 16th century in literature